Ruth Francken (1924 in Prague – 12 September 2006 in Paris) was a Czech-American sculptor, painter, and furniture designer who was mostly  active in Paris.

Biography 
Born in Prague in 1926, Ruth Francken's life and career would span over six decades, two continents, and more than half a dozen countries. After studying painting from 1939-1940 at the Ruskin School in Oxford, England, she moved to New York, where she studied at the Art Students League of New York. After becoming an American citizen in 1942, she worked as a textile designer until 1949, when she left the United States for Europe. After a two-year period in Venice (1950-1952), she moved to Paris, where she lived until her death in 2006, save for two years in the 1960s and 1970s when she worked out of Berlin and Santa Barbara, California.

Artwork and style 
Ruth Francken was considered an Abstract Expressionist in her early career, until around 1964. After this point she began working with object sculptures, collage, and different textiles and techniques, and her art took on a more surrealist and pop-art aesthetic. She focuses heavily on problems and disconnects in communication. Her work was featured in an international exhibit, initially created by Tate Modern in London, titled "The World Goes Pop."

References

Further reading 
 Stonard, John-Paul. "Francken, Ruth." In Grove Art Online. Oxford Art Online,  (accessed 16 February 2012).
 Lyotard, Jean-François (1991). "Sear of Silence". In: Jean-François Lyotard, Miscellaneous Texts II: Contemporary Artists.  Leuven University Press, 2012, pp. 4102–423. .
Lyotard, Jean-François (1983) "The Story of Ruth". In The Lyotard Reader ed. Andrew Benjamin, Oxford: Blackwell, 1989. pp. 250–264.

External links 
 Entry for Ruth Francken on the Union List of Artist Names
 Entry for Ruth Francken on the costis.org website
 Entry for Ruth Francken on the Tate website

Czechoslovak emigrants to the United States
American furniture designers
American women sculptors
American women painters
Artists from Prague
1924 births
2006 deaths
20th-century American sculptors
20th-century American painters
20th-century American women artists
Czechoslovak expatriates in the United Kingdom
21st-century American women